Shooting at the 2019 African Games was held from 25 to 30 August 2019 in Salé, Morocco.

Participating nations

Medal table

Medal summary

References

External links 
 Results

2019 African Games
African Games
2019 African Games
2019